Orchomenus ( Orchomenos), the setting for many early Greek myths, is best known today as a rich archaeological site in Boeotia, Greece, that was inhabited from the Neolithic through the Hellenistic periods. It is often referred to as "Minyan Orchomenus", to distinguish it from a later city of the same name in Arcadia.

Ancient history 

According to the founding myth of Orchomenos, its royal dynasty was established by the Minyans, who had followed their eponymous leader Minyas from coastal Thessaly to settle the site.

In the Bronze Age, during the fourteenth and thirteenth centuries BCE, Orchomenos became a rich and important centre of civilisation in Mycenaean Greece and a rival to Thebes. The palace with its frescoed walls and the great beehive tomb show the power of Orchomenos in Mycenaean Greece. A massive hydraulic undertaking drained the marshes of Lake Kopaïs, making it a rich agricultural area. Like many sites around the Aegean Sea, Orchomenos was burned and its palace destroyed in c. 1200 BC during the Bronze Age Collapse.

Orchomenos is mentioned among the Achaean cities sending ships to engage in the Trojan War in Homer's "Catalogue of Ships" in the Iliad: together with Aspledon, they contributed thirty ships and their complement of men.

Orchomenos seems to have been one of the city-states that joined the Calaurian maritime League in the seventh century BC. Although their rivals Thebes confirmed their supremacy by the end of the century reflected by inscriptions, Orchomenos joined the Theban-led Boeotian League in c. 600 BC.

Classical Orchomenos was known for its sanctuary of the Charites or Graces, the oldest in the city, according to Pausanias (5.172–80); the Byzantine (9th century) monastery church of Panagia Skripou probably occupies the long-sacred spot. Here the Charites had their earliest veneration, in legend instituted by Eteocles; musical and poetical agonistic games, the Charitesia, were held in their honour, in the theatre that was discovered in 1972. The Agrionia, a festival of the god Dionysus, involved the ritual pursuit of women by a man representing Dionysus. Orchomenos struck its coinage from the mid-sixth century.

In 480–479 BC, the Orchomenians joined their neighbouring rivals the Thebans to turn back the invading forces of Xerxes in the Greco-Persian Wars. In mid-century, Orchomenos sheltered the oligarchic exiles who freed Boeotia from Athenian control. In the fourth century the traditional rivalry with Thebes made Orchomenos an ally of Agesilaus II and Sparta against Thebes, in 395 and again in 394 BC. The Theban revenge after their defeat of Sparta in the battle of Leuctra (371 BC) was delayed by the tolerant policies of Epaminondas: the Boeotian League sacked Orchomenos in 364 BC. Although the Phocians rebuilt the city in 355 BC, the Thebans destroyed it again in 349.

The broad plain between Orchomenos and the acropolis of Chaeronea witnessed two battles of major importance in Classical antiquity. In 338 BC, after a whirlwind march south into central Greece, Philip II of Macedon defeated Thebes and Athens on the plain of Chaironeia during the First Battle of Chaeronea, establishing Macedonian supremacy over the city-states, and demonstrated the prowess of Philip's young son Alexander the Great. During Alexander's campaign against Thebes in 335 BC, Orchomenos took the side of the Macedonians. In recompense, Philip and Alexander rebuilt Orchomenos, when the theatre and the fortification walls, visible today, were constructed.

The Second Battle of Chaeronea occurred when Roman Republican forces under the later Dictator Sulla defeated those of King Mithridates VI of Pontus near Chaeronea, in 86 BC during the First Mithridatic War. This Second Battle of Chaeronea was followed by the Battle of Orchomenus, when Archelaus' forces were completely destroyed.

Orchomenos remained a small town until Late Roman times, when the theatre was still in use, and afterwards.

Archaeology

Most excavations have focussed on the early and Mycenean areas of the lower town, while the later Hellenistic city on the acropolis remains largely unexplored.

In 1880–86, Heinrich Schliemann's excavations (H. Schliemann, Orchomenos, Leipzig 1881) revealed the tholos tomb he called the "Tomb of Minyas", a Mycenaean monument that equalled the "Tomb of Atreus" at Mycenae itself. In 1893, A. de Ridder excavated the temple of Asklepios and some burials in the Roman necropolis. In 1903–05, a Bavarian archaeological mission under Heinrich Bulle and Adolf Furtwängler conducted successful excavations at the site. Research continued in 1970–73 by the Archaeological Service under Theodore Spyropoulos, uncovering the Mycenaean palace, a prehistoric cemetery, the theatre and other structures.

The Tomb of Minyas is one of the greatest burial monuments of the Mycenaean period. The tomb was probably built for the members of the royal family of Orchomenos in 1250 BC and was plundered in antiquity. The monument was visible for many centuries after its original use and even became a place of worship in the Hellenistic period. It was probably a famous landmark until at least the second century AD, when Pausanias visited Orchomenos and described the tholos in detail. It had a dromos thirty metres long. Its entrance was built of dark grey Levadeia marble and had a wooden door. The lintel, still in place today, is six metres long and weighs several tons. The entrance and the chamber were decorated with bronze rosettes as shown by the attachment holes on the walls and the ceiling of the side chamber is decorated with spirals and floral motifs in relief. In the centre of the Tholos, a rectangular burial monument dates to the Ηellenistic period (323–30 BC). It was partially restored by the architect-archaeologist A. Orlandos. In 1994, the Hellenic Ministry of Culture undertook restoration work consisting mainly of drainage and strengthening of the walls of the side chamber.

The Neolithic remains found at Orchomenos were first thought to be in situ (Bulle 1907) but it later appeared that they consisted of fill in a levelling deposit (Kunze 1931; Treuil 1983). Thus the associated round houses (two to six metres in diameter) were in fact from the Early Bronze Age (2800–1900 BC). Later in that period, houses were apsidal.

The Mycenaean palace to the east of the Tholos tomb and lying partially underneath the church is only partially excavated and consists of three wings, some of which were decorated with frescoes. The palace was destroyed c. 1200 BC.

The fortification walls of Orchomenos were built in the 2nd half of the 4th century BC under the Macedonians and crown the east end of mount Akontion.

The theatre was built around the end of the 4th century BC. The cavea, with seats for the spectators, the orchestra and part of the scena are all preserved. It was in use until late Roman times (4th century AD).

Art and sculpture

Orchomenos gives its name to a period of sculpture of archaic Kouroi, the Orchomenos-Thera group of 590–570 BC. This period witnessed a lull in Attica, but activity was more vigorous in Boeotia, especially from the Ptoon sanctuary and Orchomenos (NAMA 9).

The characteristics of this style are: the ear is still carved in one plane, but less stylised. Eyes are not so large as before and more rounded. Mouth is horizontal but no longer always in one plane. The slight protrusions of flanks are sometimes prolonged into a girdle-like ridge, the sculptor occasionally marks the anterior spine of the crest. Shoulder blades are now separate raised planes. The erector spinae sometimes indicated as raised planes. Arms are generally joined to body. The depression over great trochanter is generally omitted. Shin sometimes curves inwards. Left flank is occasionally placed slightly forward.

Minyan ware is a term that was coined to describe a certain type of pottery that was found here.

Later history

Opposite the ancient theatre is the 9th-century Byzantine church of the Dormition of the Virgin Mary (Panagia) of Skripou. Well-preserved inscriptions date the church securely to 873/4 CE, naming its sponsor as the Protospatharios Leon, who served as a senior official of the emperor Basil I during the period of his joint reign with his sons Constantine and Leo. 

The modern municipality of Orchomenos was formed in the local government reform of 2011 by the merger of the following two former municipalities, which became municipal units, each subdivided into local communities:
Akraifnia (Akraifnio, Kastro, Kokkino)
Orchomenos (Agios Dimitrios, Agios Spyridonas, Dionysos, Karya, Loutsio, Orchomenos, Pavlos, Pyrgos)

The municipality has an area of 415.914 km2, the municipal unit Orchomenos 230.098 km2, the community Orchomenos 43.431 km2. The seat of the municipality is in the town Orchomenos.

See also
Achaean League
Orchomenos, a king in Greek mythology.
Erginus, king of Orchomenus.
Elara and her son Tityos
Eurybotadas
Cephissus

Notes

References
Hellenic Ministry of Culture: Orchomenos
(Dartmouth College) Orchomenos
Prieto-Domínguez, Oscar, On the Founder of the Skripou Church Greek, Roman and Byzantine Studies (2013)

External links

Official website (in Greek)
 

Boeotian city-states
Populated places in Boeotia
Municipalities of Central Greece
Archaeological sites in Central Greece
Mycenaean sites in Boeotia
Former populated places in Greece
Roman sites in Greece
Ancient Greek archaeological sites in Greece
Cities in ancient Greece
Neolithic sites in Greece
Ancient Greek cities
Populated places in ancient Boeotia